Indus Health Plus (P) Ltd. is a "Preventive Health Checkup" Company. The company provides services through their healthcare delivery partners in Maharashtra, Gujarat, Karnataka, Kerala, Telangana, Andhra Pradesh, Tamil Nadu, Goa, Madhya Pradesh, Delhi, Haryana, Uttar Pradesh and Punjab. Recently, Indus Health Plus has also started United Arab Emirates (UAE) operations.

A 2005 report of the National Commission on Macroeconomics and Health states that "Prevention of diseases, particularly Non-communicable disease (lifestyle diseases) that are expensive to treat, is the most cost-effective strategy for a country facing scarce resources."

History 

Indus Health Plus was founded in 2000 at Pune. In 2007, the company opened branch office at Mumbai and in 2009, the company opened North Regional office at Delhi and partnered with a hospital.

Board of directors
 Kanchan Naikawadi  - Director
 Amol Naikawadi     - Joint Managing Director
 Parnal Dekhane     - Joint Managing Director

See also 
 Health
 Frost & Sullivan
 ASSOCHAM
 Preventive healthcare
 List of hospitals in India

References 

Health care companies of India